The Raf tomato is a tomato (Solanum lycopersicum, Solanaceae) obtained from artificial selection practiced on traditional tomatoes are planted outdoors since 1961. It is originally from  Spain. The Raf tomato Marmande is a variety which stands out for its flavor and texture, as well as its resistance to water with high salt content.

The name Raf derives from the fact that it is resistant to a fungus called Fusarium oxysporum lycopersici (in Spanish, "resistente al Fusarium"). This was one of the causes of its popularization in greenhouse cultivation. Raf is the product of a selection of traditional tomatoes so it is not a hybrid tomato.

In Spain the production areas most relevant to this type of tomato are the neighborhood of Cabo de Gata and the municipality of Nijar, both in Almeria (Spain)- Cabo de Gata-Nijar Natural Park.

Features 

Their morphology is special and very characteristic. It is a fruit of irregular shape with deep furrows that end in the center, oval and flattened at the ends. These grooves make it very recognizable and attest to its quality. Its color is deep green with touches approaching the black on top.

Inside the pulp is a pinkish color, compact very firm and juicy, meaty texture with small seeds. It is consistent and usually has a delicious sweet taste (9 degrees brix) due to the balance between sugar and acidity of citrus and malic type. Maturation occurs from the inside out.

The Raf tomato is a vigorous plant but current productions try to reduce this original vigor he has done that encompasses within un-determinate transportation and medium vigor. Its natural size can reach 4 m while production will rarely let the feet.

The reason that the Raf tomato is peculiar given for their growing conditions. Need a certain salinity water to counteract generating the fruit sugars. It has been cultivated for decades but semi-abandonment by more intensive crops. Originally it was cultivated in the open but now is under street or under plastic mesh.

The production is usually limited to about 2,000 acres and yield of a plant usually 4–6 kg. The yield of a tomato plant of another variety ranges from 20 to 22 kg of product medium.

See also 
 List of tomato cultivars

References 

 
 

Tomato cultivars